Claudia Lichtenberg (née Häusler; born 17 November 1985 in Munich) is a German former professional cyclist, who now works as a coach for German amateur team RSV Irschenberg.

Born in Munich, Lichtenberg won the Tour de l'Aude in 2009, a race which, at the time, was called the "women's Tour de France", and also the Giro d'Italia Femminile.

She competed for Germany at the 2016 Summer Olympics where she finished in 31st place in the women's road race.

On the first day of the 2017 Giro d'Italia Femminile, Lichtenberg announced her retirement from professional road racing at the end of the 2017 season written in a  rider blog.

Personal life
She married German former professional cyclist Christian Lichtenberg in mid-2014 and began racing under her married name.

Major results
Source:

2005
 1st Young rider classification, Giro del Trentino Alto Adige-Südtirol
 6th Overall Giro della Toscana Int. Femminile – Memorial Michela Fanini
2006
 1st  Road race, National Road Championships
 4th Overall Giro della Toscana Int. Femminile – Memorial Michela Fanini
 6th Overall Giro del Trentino Alto Adige-Südtirol
 8th Overall Tour de l'Aude Cycliste Féminin
 9th Sparkassen Giro
2007
 National Road Championships
1st  Mountain race
2nd Road race
 1st Mountains classification, Tour du Grand Montréal
 4th Road race, UEC European Under-23 Road Championships
 5th Overall Giro della Toscana Int. Femminile – Memorial Michela Fanini
 10th Coupe du Monde Cycliste Féminine de Montréal
2008
 1st Großer Volvo Preis Villingen-Schwenningen
 1st Allgäuer Straßenpreis
 3rd Overall Giro del Trentino Alto Adige-Südtirol
 3rd Overall Giro d'Italia Femminile
1st Stage 6
 7th Overall Tour de l'Aude Cycliste Féminin
1st Young rider classification
 7th Overall Iurreta-Emakumeen Bira
2009
 1st  Overall Giro d'Italia Femminile
1st Stage 7
 1st  Overall Tour de l'Aude Cycliste Féminin
 1st Rund um Schönaich
 1st Allgäuer Straßenpreis
 2nd Overall Iurreta-Emakumeen Bira
 3rd La Flèche Wallonne Féminine
 6th Overall Giro del Trentino Alto Adige-Südtirol
2010
 1st  Overall Iurreta-Emakumeen Bira
1st Mountains classification
 3rd Overall Giro del Trentino Alto Adige-Südtirol
 4th Overall Giro d'Italia Femminile
 4th Overall Tour de l'Aude Cycliste Féminin
1st Stage 1 (TTT)
 10th Valkenburg Hills Classic
2011
 2nd Overall Giro della Toscana Int. Femminile – Memorial Michela Fanini
 5th Overall Trophée d'Or Féminin
 7th Overall Thüringen Rundfahrt der Frauen
2012
 1st Rund um Schönaich
 1st Allgäuer Straßenpreis
 1st Max Ernst Gedächtnisrennen
 2nd Open de Suède Vårgårda TTT
 6th Overall The Exergy Tour
1st Stage 4
 8th Overall Giro d'Italia Femminile
 10th Overall Emakumeen Euskal Bira
2013
 1st  Overall Giro della Toscana Int. Femminile – Memorial Michela Fanini
 1st  Overall Joe Martin Stage Race
1st Prologue
 1st Stage 6 North Star Grand Prix
 2nd Overall Cascade Cycling Classic
1st Stage 1
 3rd Overall Giro d'Italia Femminile
 3rd Philadelphia Cycling Classic
 5th Overall Holland Ladies Tour
 6th Chrono Gatineau
 8th Le Samyn des Dames
2014
 1st  Overall La Route de France
1st Stage 1
 4th Overall Holland Ladies Tour
 5th Overall Emakumeen Euskal Bira
 6th Overall Giro d'Italia Femminile
 9th La Flèche Wallonne Féminine
2015
 2nd Road race, National Road Championships
 3rd Overall La Route de France
 5th GP de Plouay
2016
 2nd Overall Giro del Trentino Alto Adige-Südtirol
 2nd Overall Trophée d'Or Féminin
1st Stage 5 
 4th Overall Giro d'Italia Femminile
 6th Overall Festival Luxembourgeois du cyclisme féminin Elsy Jacobs
 7th Overall Emakumeen Euskal Bira
 8th Strade Bianche Women
 9th Tour of Flanders for Women
 10th Overall Auensteiner–Radsporttage
2017
 8th Overall Setmana Ciclista Valenciana
 9th Overall Giro d'Italia Femminile

References

External links

 
 
 
 
 
 
 
 
 
 

1985 births
Living people
Cyclists from Munich
German female cyclists
Cyclists at the 2016 Summer Olympics
Olympic cyclists of Germany
20th-century German women
21st-century German women